The 2019 Syracuse Orange football team represented Syracuse University during the 2019 NCAA Division I FBS football season. The Orange were led by fourth-year head coach Dino Babers and played their home games at the Carrier Dome, competing as members of the Atlantic Division of the Atlantic Coast Conference. They finished the season 5–7, 2–6 in ACC play to finish in sixth place in the Atlantic Division.

Previous season
Syracuse ended the 2018 season with a 10-3 overall record, 6-2 in the ACC, to finish in second place in the ACC Atlantic Division. They were invited to the Camping World Bowl, where they defeated West Virginia.

Offseason

Offseason departures

NFL draftees

Undrafted free agents

Recruiting
Syracuse's 2019 recruiting class consisted of 21 signees. The class was ranked as the 10th best class in the ACC and the 55th best class overall according to the 247Sports Composite.

Preseason

Award watch lists
Listed in the order that they were released

Preseason media poll
In the preseason ACC media poll, Syracuse was predicted to finish in second in the Atlantic Division, and received the second-most votes to win the conference championship game (although Clemson received 170 of 173 total votes).

Schedule

Rankings

Game summaries

at Liberty

at Maryland

Clemson

Western Michigan

Holy Cross

at NC State

Pittsburgh

at Florida State

Boston College

at Duke

at Louisville

Wake Forest

Players drafted into the NFL

References

Syracuse
Syracuse Orange football seasons
Syracuse Orange football